The U.S.-Oman Free Trade Agreement is a trade pact between Oman and the United States. On November 15, 2004, the George W. Bush administration notified the U.S. Congress of its intent to sign a trade agreement with the Middle Eastern Sultanate of Oman. On January 19, 2006 the two countries signed the U.S.-Oman Free Trade Agreement (OFTA), which is part of the Bush administration's strategy to create a US - Middle East Free Trade Area (MEFTA) by 2013.

On June 29, 2006, the U.S. Senate passed OFTA by a vote of 60-34, the fewest "aye" votes in the Senate of any trade bill other than CAFTA. On July 20, 2006, the U.S. House of Representatives passed OFTA by a vote of 221-205, with 7 abstentions. For procedural reasons, the Senate took a second vote on September 19, 2006, and the bill's implementing bill was passed 62-32, with 6 abstentions. In all, the Senate approved the bill 63-37, since all senators voted either "aye" or "nay" in one of the two votes.

George W. Bush signed the bill into law on September 26, 2006.
And on December 29, 2008 signed the proclamation to implement the agreement with effective date of January 1, 2009.

Views in favor of OFTA 

According to the U.S. Trade Representative's office and other proponents of the pact, OFTA is an important step towards reducing barriers to trade in goods and services in Oman.
USTR Site on OFTA
Emergency Committee for American Trade Site on OFTA
House Ways and Means Committee's Republican Leadership's Site on OFTA

See more
Rules of Origin
Market access
Free-trade area
Tariffs

References

External links 
U.S. House Ways and Means Committee Hearing on Oman FTA
U.S. Senate Finance Committee Hearing on Oman FTA
Congressional Research Service Study on OFTA
U.S. International Trade Commission Report on OFTA
State Department Report on Human Trafficking in Oman
Roll Call Story on News Conference with Reps. John Murtha (D-Pa.) and Walter Jones (R-N.C.) on port security implications of OFTA
Congressional Research Service Memo on OFTA and port security issues
Testimony on OFTA of David Hamod, National U.S.-Arab Chamber of Commerce
Jerusalem Post Story on OFTA and Oman's Observance of a Boycott of Israel

Economy of Oman
Free trade agreements of the United States
Treaties of Oman
Treaties concluded in 2006
Treaties entered into force in 2009
Oman–United States relations